Jani-Petteri Helenius (born January 18, 1990) is a Finnish professional ice hockey player who currently plays for Jokerit of the SM-liiga.

References

External links

Living people
Jokerit players
Ice hockey people from Helsinki
1990 births
Finnish ice hockey forwards